The following is the filmography and credits for American actor Eli Wallach (December 7, 1915 – June 24, 2014). He started acting in 1945 and is known for his film roles as Calvera in The Magnificent Seven (1960), Tuco in The Good, the Bad and the Ugly (1966), Napoleon in The Adventures of Gerard (1970), Cotton Weinberger in The Two Jakes (1990), Don Altobello in The Godfather Part III (1990), Donald Fallon in The Associate (1996), Arthur Abbott in The Holiday (2006), Noah Dietrich in The Hoax (2007), and Julie Steinhardt in Wall Street: Money Never Sleeps (2010), which was the last film he appeared in before retiring in 2010.

He has also appeared in numerous television series, most known for playing Mr. Freeze in two episodes of Batman in 1967.

Filmography

Film

Television

Television films

Documentaries

Theatre

Radio appearances

 Wallach read out Stephen King's novel Insomnia for Hodder & Stoughton Audio.

References

External links
 
 

Male actor filmographies
American filmographies